The 2012–13 UEFA Champions League group stage featured 32 teams: the 22 automatic qualifiers and the 10 winners of the play-off round (five through the Champions Route, five through the League Route).

The teams were drawn into eight groups of four, and played each other home-and-away in a round-robin format. The top two teams in each group advanced to the round of 16, while the third-placed teams dropped down to the Europa League round of 32.

Seeding
The draw for the group stage was held on 30 August 2012, 17:45 CEST (UTC+2), at Grimaldi Forum, Monaco.

Teams were seeded into four pots based on their 2012 UEFA club coefficients. The title holders, Chelsea, were automatically seeded into Pot 1. Pot 1 holds teams ranked 1–12, Pot 2 holds teams ranked 13–31, Pot 3 holds teams ranked 32–60, while Pot 4 holds teams ranked 63–171.

Notes
th Title holder (automatically gets the top position of seeding list)
CR Qualified through play-off round (Champions Route)
LR Qualified through play-off round (League Route)

Each group contained one team from each of the four pots, with the restriction that teams from the same national association cannot be drawn against each other. Moreover, the draw was controlled for teams from the same association in order to split the teams evenly into the two sets of groups (A–D, E–H) for maximum television coverage.

The fixtures were decided after the draw. On each matchday, four groups played their matches on Tuesday, while the other four groups played their matches on Wednesday, with the two sets of groups (A–D, E–H) alternating between each matchday. There were other restrictions, e.g., teams from the same city (e.g. Manchester United and Manchester City) in general did not play at home on the same matchday (UEFA tries to avoid teams from the same city playing at home on the same day or on consecutive days), and Russian teams did not play at home on the last matchday due to cold weather.

Tiebreakers
The teams are ranked according to points (3 points for a win, 1 point for a tie, 0 points for a loss). If two or more teams are equal on points on completion of the group matches, the following criteria are applied to determine the rankings:
higher number of points obtained in the group matches played among the teams in question;
superior goal difference from the group matches played among the teams in question;
higher number of goals scored in the group matches played among the teams in question;
higher number of goals scored away from home in the group matches played among the teams in question;
If, after applying criteria 1) to 4) to several teams, two teams still have an equal ranking, criteria 1) to 4) are reapplied exclusively to the matches between the two teams in question to determine their final rankings. If this procedure does not lead to a decision, criteria 6) to 8) apply;
superior goal difference from all group matches played;
higher number of goals scored from all group matches played;
higher number of coefficient points accumulated by the club in question, as well as its association, over the previous five seasons.

Groups
The matchdays were 18–19 September, 2–3 October, 23–24 October, 6–7 November, 20–21 November, and 4–5 December 2012.

Times are CET/CEST, as listed by UEFA (local times are in parentheses).

Group A

Group B

Group C

Group D

Group E

Notes
Note 1: FC Nordsjælland played their home matches at Parken Stadium, Copenhagen instead of their regular stadium, Farum Park, Farum.

Group F

Tiebreakers
 Bayern Munich are ranked ahead of Valencia on head-to-head points.

Notes
Note 2: BATE Borisov played their home matches at Dynamo, Minsk instead of their regular stadium, Gradski Stadium, Borisov as it did not meet UEFA criteria.

Group G

Group H

Tiebreakers
Galatasaray are ranked ahead of CFR Cluj on head-to-head points.

Notes

References

External links
2012–13 UEFA Champions League, UEFA.com

Group
2012-13